Grasmere is a suburb of the Macarthur Region of Sydney in the state of New South Wales, Australia in Camden Council.

History
The area now known as Grasmere was originally home to the Gandangara people of the Southern Highlands although the Muringong, southernmost of the Darug people, were also known to inhabit the area. In 1805, wool pioneer John Macarthur was granted 5,000 acres (20 km2) at Cowpastures (now Camden). Grasmere is still primarily a rural locality.

Demographics
In the 2011 census, the suburb of Grasmere had a population of 1,712 people. The median age of residents was 54 and 39.1% of people were aged 65 or over. The majority of people were born in Australia and the most common ancestries were English, Australian and Irish. The top responses for religious affiliation were Anglican 36.0% and Catholic 35.2%. The median household weekly income of $1,025 was lower than the national median of $1,234.

Politics 
Grasmere lies in the south ward of Camden Council, currently represented by Chris Patterson (who is also the Mayor of Camden), Eva Campbell and Fred Whiteman. It sits within the state electorate of Camden, represented by Labor's Geoff Corrigan, the former Mayor of Camden, and the federal electorate of Macarthur, represented by Liberal's Pat Farmer, the former ultra-marathon runner.

References

External links
  [CC-By-SA]
  [CC-By-SA]

Suburbs of Sydney
Camden Council (New South Wales)